Yang Sisurat is a district (amphoe) in the south of Maha Sarakham province, northeastern Thailand.

Geography
Neighboring districts are (from the north clockwise): Na Chueak, Na Dun, and Phayakkhaphum Phisai of Maha Sarakham Province; Phutthaisong and Na Pho of Buriram province.

History
The minor district (king amphoe) was created on 1 April 1989, when six tambons were split off from Phayakkhaphum Phisai district. It was upgraded to a full district on 8 September 1995.

Administration
The district is divided into seven sub-districts (tambons), which are further subdivided into 91 villages (mubans). There are no municipal (thesaban) areas, and seven tambon administrative organizations (TAO).

References

External links
amphoe.com

Yang Sisurat